Kim Eu-ro (born 7 October 1999) is a South Korean cyclist, who currently rides for UCI Continental team .

Major results
2017
 Asian Junior Track Championships
1st  Points race
2nd  Team pursuit
3rd  Scratch
2019
 1st  Road race, National Road Championships
 6th Road race, Asian Under-23 Road Championships
2020
 Asian Track Championships
1st  Points race
1st  Madison (with Shin Don-gin)
2022
 2nd  Points race, Asian Track Championships

References

External links
 

1999 births
Living people
South Korean male cyclists
South Korean track cyclists